GFI may refer to:

 Caribbean Star Airlines, a defunct airline of Antigua and Barbuda
 GFI Group, an American financial services company
 Go4It, a British children's radio programme
 Gold Fields, a South African mining company
 Golden Future Institute, a school in Addis Ababa, Ethiopia
 The Good Food Institute, a nonprofit organization promoting plant- and cell-based alternatives to animal products
 Grand Forks International, a baseball tournament
 Ground fault circuit interrupter, an electrical safety device
 Goodness of fit, a measure of how well a statistical model fits a set of observations